Michael Eric Buck (born April 22, 1967) is a former American football quarterback in the National Football League.

Early years
He attended high school at Sayville, New York, and played college football at the University of Maine.

Professional career
Mike Buck was a 6th round selection (156th overall pick) in the 1990 NFL Draft by the New Orleans Saints. Buck made his NFL debut in 1991 playing for the New Orleans Saints. Buck would play for the Saints through the 1993 NFL season. Buck would later play for the Arizona Cardinals and Miami Dolphins of the NFL.

Coaching career
Mike Buck coached the Pensacola Barracudas and Norfolk Nighthawks of af2, 2000–01.[Lubbock lonestars]

Mike is currently a teacher and coach for Walt Whitman High School in Huntington Station, New York. He is also the owner of a metal shingle roofing company that provides the greenest roofs in the business.(Forever Metal Shingles N.Y.)

References

1967 births
Living people
People from Sayville, New York
American football quarterbacks
Maine Black Bears football players
New Orleans Saints players
Arizona Cardinals players
Miami Dolphins players
Las Vegas Outlaws (XFL) players
Players of American football from New York (state)
Af2 coaches